David Joselit is an American art historian who is currently Professor of Art, Film, and Visual Studies at Harvard University, and also a published author, including being an editor of October.

Career
Joselit received his PhD from Harvard University.

At Yale, Joselit was a Carnegie Professor and also a past Harris Lecturer at Northwestern University. In 2014, Joselit was appointed as Distinguished Professor of Art History at The Graduate Center, CUNY where he taught until 2020.

In addition to his teaching activities, Joselit has been serving on the advisory board of the Hauser & Wirth Institute since 2018.

Selected works 
What to Do with Pictures. October Magazine, Fall 2011.

Signal Processing: David Joselit on Abstraction Then and Now, Artforum, Summer issue, 2011.

After Art. Princeton University Press, 2012.

References

Year of birth missing (living people)
Living people
City University of New York faculty
American art historians
University of California, Irvine faculty
Yale University faculty
21st-century American historians
21st-century American male writers
Harvard University alumni
Harvard University faculty
American male non-fiction writers